Leiber is a German surname. Notable people with the surname include:

Fridolin Leiber (1853–1912), German painter
Fritz Leiber (1910–1992), American writer of fantasy, horror and science fiction.
Fritz Leiber, Sr. (1882–1949), American actor
Hank Leiber (1911–1983), American baseball player
Jerry Leiber (1933–2011), American songwriter and record producer
Judith Leiber (1921–2018), American fashion designer
Justin Leiber (1938–2016), American philosopher and science fiction writer
Robert Leiber (1887–1967), German Roman Catholic priest

See also
Nickname for members of the Royal Bavarian Infantry Lifeguards Regiment (Leibregiment)
Lieber

Jewish surnames
German-language surnames
Yiddish-language surnames